Terry McDonald or Terence McDonald may refer to:

Terry McDonald (footballer) (born 1939), English football player
Terry McDonald (ice hockey) (born 1955), Canadian ice hockey player
Mac McDonald (born Terence McDonald 1949), American actor who plays Captain Hollister in Red Dwarf

See also 
Teri MacDonald (born 1963), Canadian racing driver